Juhani Kyöstilä (4 July 1931 – 30 June 2010) was a Finnish basketball player. He competed in the men's tournament at the 1952 Summer Olympics.

References

1931 births
2010 deaths
Finnish men's basketball players
Olympic basketball players of Finland
Basketball players at the 1952 Summer Olympics
Sportspeople from Helsinki